Amirul Mukminin (born 6 August 1984) is an Indonesian professional footballer who plays as a attacking midfielder for Liga 2 club Sriwijaya.

Club career

Martapura FC
In 2018, Amirul signed a contract with Indonesian Liga 2 club Martapura. He made 45 league appearances and scored 3 goals for Martapura.

Muba Babel United
He was signed for Muba Babel United to play in Liga 2 in the 2020 season. This season was suspended on 27 March 2020 due to the COVID-19 pandemic. The season was abandoned and was declared void on 20 January 2021.

International career

National team

Honours

Club honours
Sriwijaya
Liga Indonesia Premier Division: 2007-08
Copa Indonesia: 2007, 2009, 2010
Barito Putera
Liga Indonesia Premier Division: 2011-12

References

External links
 Amirul Mukminin at Soccerway
 Amirul Mukminin at Liga Indonesia

1984 births
Living people
People from Palembang
Association football midfielders
Indonesian footballers
Liga 1 (Indonesia) players
Indonesian Premier Division players
Sriwijaya F.C. players
PS Barito Putera players